Late Night Live is a radio program broadcast by the Australian Broadcasting Corporation's  Radio National and podcast and streamed over the World Wide Web.

Since 1991, the program has been hosted by farmer, writer and public intellectual Phillip Adams, who refers to the program by its acronym 'LNL', which during 2016 morphed into 'FNL'. He also calls it 'the little wireless program'. Previous hosts include publisher and journalist Richard Ackland, and Virginia Bell, formerly a judge of the High Court of Australia. Recent guest hosts include: Tracey Holmes, Jonathan Green, Elizabeth Jackson and Andrew West. 

Often the setting for a serious and learned discussion of politics, science, philosophy and culture, the program aims to host cutting-edge discussion of public debate, and present ideas and issues not yet covered by other Australian media.

The programme is broadcast from 10:05 pm until 11 pm Mondays to Thursdays, and is repeat broadcast at 3:05 pm from Tuesdays to Fridays. During January of each year, selected segments from the previous 10 or 11 months are re-broadcast, in lieu of fresh programming.

In 2011 a special online retrospective was compiled to celebrate 20 years behind the LNL microphone, called "In Bed With Phillip".  Over 200 of the best interviews from these years are now available to listen and download. 

To coincide with Phillip's 20th anniversary at LNL he wrote "Bedtime Stories: Tales from my 21 years at RN's Late Night Live", published by HarperCollins, outlining why he decided to join RN, his early experiences with producers, talent and what the time has meant to him personally.

Regular contributors 

Regular contributors include Laura Tingle, (https://www.abc.net.au/news/laura-tingle/9711054) Chief Political Correspondent for 7.30, ABC TV  who each Monday night discusses the most recent national political issues.  Each Tuesday is Bruce Shapiro, an American journalist and Director of the Dart Center for Journalism and Trauma. Shapiro and Adams usually discuss contemporary USA politics, though the discussion can often be wide-ranging and include global politics. Every second Wednesday Phillip is joined by Ian Dunt, Editor-at-Large of Politics.co.uk, to discuss the latest political, cultural and economic news from Britain, Scotland, Ireland and Europe. Less frequent regular contributors include the economist Satyajit Das and Dr Tess Newton Cain, from Griffith University, who reports monthly on the Asia-Pacific region.

Guests
Include high-profile thinkers, writers, journalists and players from the literary, cultural and political world. Over the past 30 years guests have included Henry Kissinger, Madeleine Albright, Gerry Adams, Arundhati Roy, David Frum, Isabelle Allende, Kevin Rudd, Oliver Stone, and former Soviet president Mikhail Gorbachev, as well as the late Christopher Hitchens, Gore Vidal, Arthur Miller, Arthur C. Clarke, Jessica Mitford, Malcolm Fraser and Gough Whitlam to name just some.

Format 
Most programs are divided into three segments, each segment delineated by a sting, a short piece of instrumental music lasting about 30 seconds, though occasional one-hour conversations involving one or more guests are becoming more frequent.

Adams' style is conversational and casual, not adversarial. He introduces his guests using their first and last names, followed by their qualifications and notable positions and achievements, and subsequently addresses them by their first name. When a guest is a university professor occupying a named chair, Adams usually asks the guest to briefly explain who or what the chair is named after. The pace is relaxed. Adams generally exerts subtle but firm control over the conversation's direction.

For many years, Adams has referred to his audience as "Gladys", the joke being that only one person is listening and that is her name.  With the advent of podcasting and web streaming, Adams has since added "Poddies" to his listenership, and will often talk or refer to his "Gladdies and Poddies".  He also has Noddies (who fall asleep to his program) and Maddies (who write him vitriolic letters), and now "Tweethearts" to include those who follow him on Twitter.

Production
The program has a staff of four: Adams, an executive producer, and three producers (who each do one night shift per week.) Technical producer also puts the program to air each night.  Though Adams may make suggestions, the producers decide on the topic and guests, and they suggest questions, which Adams may take or leave.

Audience
In 2020 LNL monthly downloads had grown to over 1 million and shows no sign of lessening.  It is the second most popular of all ABC radio programs, following Richard Fidler's Conversations.

In 2010 the estimated cumulative audience (number who listened during the past week) was 350,000, and the show was downloaded 217,463 times in August. Seventy five percent of downloads are to Australia, 6% to the US and 3% to Britain. Sixty five percent of listeners are university graduates; 90% are forty or older; 40% hold "AB" (e.g., white collar) jobs while 45% are not in the workforce (retired or home duties – not unemployed), and 55% are women.

Theme music
The current theme music is the first movement of Giuseppe Brescianello's violin concerto no. 4 in e-minor, Op. 1, performed by the Australian Brandenburg Orchestra.

Until March 2016 the theme was the Eliza Aria from the Wild Swans ballet by Elena Kats-Chernin.  This replaced Russian Rag also by Kats-Chernin, which Adams jokingly referred to as the 'Waltz of the Wombats'. Several different arrangements have been used:  Clarinet, trumpet, marimba, harp, violin, viola, cello, double bass;  Flute, oboe, clarinet, bassoon, horn, 2 violins, viola, cello, double bass;  Flute, piano, cello; Bassoon with piano; Clarinet with piano; Violin with piano and unaccompanied Piano.

The previous theme, adopted soon after Adams took over as host, was the third movement of Johann Sebastian Bach's Concerto for two harpsichords in C minor (BWV 1060).

References

External links
Late Night Live website
In Bed With Phillip 20 years of Late Night Live on ABC Radio National

Australian Broadcasting Corporation radio programs
Australian radio programs
1990s Australian radio programs
2000s Australian radio programs
2010s Australian radio programs